Ancelle is a commune in the Hautes-Alpes department in southeastern France. The village is a tourist destination for both the summer and winter seasons, offering a range of sporting activities such as hiking, cross country skiing and camping. Ancelle has a small, neighbouring village called Les Taillas, located to the south of the main town centre.

Population

See also
Communes of the Hautes-Alpes department

References

External links
Website at ancelle.fr

Communes of Hautes-Alpes
Dauphiné